K. A. M. Muhammed Abubacker is an Indian politician from Tamil Nadu and Tamilnadu State General Secretary of the Indian Union Muslim League (IUML) political party. He was Legislative Party Leader of the Indian Union Muslim League from 2016 to 2021.

External links 
 
 Official Website
 Article in The Hindu
 Article in ShowToday TV

References 

1971 births
Living people
Politicians from Chennai
Indian Union Muslim League
Leaders of the Opposition in Tamil Nadu
Tamil Nadu MLAs 2016–2021
Tamil Nadu politicians